Honduras became independent from Spain in 1838. It began producing its own stamps in 1866.

References

External links

http://www.philatelicdatabase.com/united-states/stamps-of-honduras-issues-of-1931/
https://www.hondurasstamps.com

Philately of Honduras